Johann Christian Brand (6 March 1722 – 12 June 1795)

was an Austrian painter (son of the German painter Christian Hilfgott Brand (1694–1756) who taught in Vienna with Karl Aigen) and brother of Friedrich August Brand.
Johann Christian Brand influenced ending the baroque era of landscape painting.  He died in Vienna.

Life and work
Johann Christian Brand was born in Vienna on 6 March 1722.  Influential in ending the baroque era, Johann studied at the Vienna Academy from 1736. He was awarded with the titles Kammermaler in 1766 and "Professor of Landscape Drawing" in 1772. The landscape paintings of Johann Christian Brand marked the transition from the baroque to the 19th-century style of landscape depiction.

Johann Christian Brand died in Vienna on 12 June 1795.

Galleries
Works by Johann Christian Brand are contained in Laxenburg Castle, Österreichische Galerie in Belvedere Palace, Vienna Art History Museum, Museum of Military History, National Gallery Prague, Göttweig, Klosterneuburg, Museum at the Schottenstift, Liechtenstein and Harrach galleries.

See also
 Christian Hilfgott Brand, father of Johann Christian Brand.

Notes

References
 "Brand, Johann Christian" (biography), aeiou Encyclopedia, 2006, webpage: aeiou-JCBrand .

External links 

1722 births
1795 deaths
18th-century Austrian painters
18th-century Austrian male artists
Austrian male painters
Austrian people of German descent
Artists from Vienna
Academy of Fine Arts Vienna alumni